Purusottampur, is a village in the taluk of Champua, district of Kendujhar, in the Indian state of Odisha. The total geographical area of village is 160 hectares. Mainly Oriya/Bangla/Hindi is the local language on the village.

Geography
It is located 63 km to the north of District headquarters Kendujhar also . And 260 km from State capital Bhubaneswar, Purusottampur Pin code is 758047 and postal head office is Nayakrishnapur. Purusottampur is surrounded by Jagannathpur Tehsil towards North, Noamundi Tehsil towards west, Manjhgaon Tehsil towards East, Raruan Tehsil towards East. This place is in the border of the Kendujhar District and West Singhbhum District (Jharkhand State Border). One third of the area of our village is covered by forests and found many trees that means variety fruits can find here like- Sal, Asan, Jamu, Arjuna, Kusum, Kangada, Mahua, Mango, Kendu.

Schools & Colleges 
Schools & Colleges in Purusottampur village includes:
UP School, Purusottampur (Govt)
ME School, Purusottampur (Govt)
BNK High School, Purusottampur (Govt)
Sree Saraswathi Vidyaah Mandira (Semi Govt)

Temples 
 Lord Jagannath Temple
 Lord Shiv Temple
Village Goddess Peetha

Govt. Office, Hospital & Clinic 
 Ayurvedic Hospital (Govt)
 Forester Guard Office (Govt) 
 Manoj Medical Clinic (Pvt)

Beaches in and around Purusottampur 
Purusottampur's nearest beach is Paradeep Sea Beach located at the distance of 283 Kilometres. Surrounding beaches from Purusottampur are as follows,

Major festivals 
In Autumn: Durga Puja, Kumar Purnima, Deepabali

In Winter: Prathamastami

In Spring: Vasant Panchami, Maha Shivaratri, Dola Purnima and Holi

In Monsoon: Ganesh Chaturthi, Ratha Yatra

References

External links 
Falling rain enomics, Inc - Purusottampur, Keonjhar
Village Directory - Purusottampur, Keonjhar
Maps/Direction to Purusottampur, Keonjhar
Census of India 2001: Data from the 2001 Census, including cities, villages and towns (Provisional)

Villages in Kendujhar district